The Koreans may refer to:

 The Koreans (band) - an indie rock band from South London
 The Koreans (book) - a non-fiction piece of literature by Michael Breen